Authors Anonymous is a 2014 American comedy film directed and produced by Ellie Kanner. It stars Kaley Cuoco, Chris Klein, Tricia Helfer, Jonathan Banks, Jonathan Bennett, Teri Polo, Dylan Walsh, and Dennis Farina. The film was released on March 18, 2014, through video on demand prior to its limited release on April 18, 2014, by Screen Media Films and Starz Digital.

Plot summary
When several dysfunctional and unpublished writers accept young Hannah into their clique, they don't expect her overnight success.

Hannah, who has rarely even read a book, let alone written one, not only manages to land a literary agent to represent her, she cashes in on a deal to turn her first manuscript into a Hollywood film. The support of her weekly writers group, Authors Anonymous, turns to resentment.

Colette Mooney receives rejection letters galore from agents and publishers. Her husband, optician Alan, speaks ideas into a hand-held recorder all day long, but never acts on them. Henry Obert has writer's block, as well as a huge crush on Hannah, while a Tom Clancy wanna-be, John K. Butzin, resorts to self-publishing in a delusional quest to become a best-selling author, helped by a young hardware store employee named Sigrid who believes in him.

In time, Hannah realizes that maintaining a relationship with these people is next to impossible, but does what she can to at least encourage Henry to begin writing again.

Cast
 Kaley Cuoco as Hannah Rinaldi
 Chris Klein as Henry Obert
 Tricia Helfer as Sigrid Hagenguth
 Jonathan Banks as David Kelleher
 Jonathan Bennett as William Bruce
 Teri Polo as Colette Mooney
 Dennis Farina as John K. Butzin
 Dylan Walsh as Alan Mooney
 Charlene Amoia as Eudora
 Meagen Fay as Maureen
Robb Skyler as Dr. Xiroman
Diane Robin as Lois Pepper

Production

Pre-production
The film is produced by director Ellie Kanner's Forever Sunny Productions (EKZ Productions) and Hal Schwartz's Bull Market Entertainment in association with Cynthia and Laine Guidry's Lainie Productions. Jonathan Bennett and Kaley Cuoco also served as executive producers to the film.

Filming
The film was shot in and around Los Angeles during August 2012. It includes one of Dennis Farina's last performances before his death in July 2013.

References

External links

2014 films
Films directed by Ellie Kanner
Films shot in Los Angeles
2014 comedy films
Films about writers
American comedy films
2010s English-language films
2010s American films